Braughing was a rural district in Hertfordshire, England from 1935 to 1974.

Creation
Braughing Rural District was created on 1 April 1935 under a County Review Order by the merger of most of the Hadham Rural District and most of the Buntingford Rural District. It was named after Braughing, a village central to the district and which was also the name of a former hundred of Hertfordshire.

Parishes
Braughing Rural District contained the following civil parishes.

Premises

The district council continued to use the offices it inherited from the two predecessor districts: Bridgefoot House in Buntingford from the Buntingford Rural District, and 2 Hockerill Street in Bishop's Stortford from the Hadham Rural District. Meetings were held alternately at each office.

Abolition
Braughing Rural District was abolished under the Local Government Act 1972, becoming part of East Hertfordshire on 1 April 1974.

References

Districts of England abolished by the Local Government Act 1972
History of Hertfordshire
1935 establishments in England
Local government in Hertfordshire